Li Dan (born 12 May 1986 in Jilin) is a Chinese speed-skater.

Li competed at the 2014 Winter Olympics for China. In the 1000 metres she placed 34th.

As of September 2014, Li's best performance at the World Sprint Speed Skating Championships is 21st, in 2014.

Li made her World Cup debut in December 2002. As of September 2014, Li's top World Cup finish is 5th in a pair of races at Harbin in 2003–04. Her best overall finish in the World Cup is 25th, in the 2003–04 1000m.

References

External links
 

1986 births
Living people
Chinese female speed skaters
Speed skaters at the 2014 Winter Olympics
Olympic speed skaters of China
Sportspeople from Jilin City